Husniddin Aliqulov (Uzbek Cyrillic: Хусниддин Алиқулов; born 4 April 1999) is an Uzbek professional footballer who plays as a defender for Nasaf.

Early life and career 
Husniddin Aliqulov was born 4 April 1999 in Kitab

Honours
Nasaf
Uzbekistan Cup winners: 2022 
AFC Cup runner-up: 2021
Mash'al Mubarek 
Pro League winners: 2018

References

External links
NFT Profile

1999 births
Living people
People from Qashqadaryo Region
Uzbekistani footballers
Uzbekistan international footballers
Uzbekistan youth international footballers
Association football goalkeepers
FC Nasaf players
Uzbekistan Super League players